MHacks is a semiannual student-run hackathon held by the University of Michigan. The 36-hour event brings students from across the world to develop creative solutions with the latest technology, including both software and hardware based solutions. MHacks is open to students all around the world of all majors and requires no prior coding experience.

History

Founding
MHacks was founded by Michelle Lu, Thomas Erdmann, Adam Williams, Dan Friedman, Dave Fontenot, who were inspired to create the event after attending a PennApps hackathon.

References

University of Michigan
Hackathons
2013 establishments in Michigan
Recurring events established in 2013